The 2nd Division  was a division of the Spanish Republican Army in the Spanish Civil War. 

This unit took part in the Segovia Offensive in June 1937.

History
The Second Division was established on 31 December 1936 with the militia forces that had been operating in the mountainous area north of Madrid. During the Segovia Offensive it carried out a diversionary attack in the Alto del León led by Lt. Colonel Luis Barceló. 

During the rest of the war it stayed in the same relatively inactive mountain front and was finally disbanded on 27 March 1939.

Order of Battle

Leaders 
Commanders
 Engineering Lt. Colonel Domingo Moriones;
 Infantry Colonel Enrique Navarro Abuja;
 Infantry Lt. Colonel Luis Barceló Jover;
 Militia Major José Suárez Montero;
 Militia Major Casto Losada Quiroga;

Commissar
José Delgado Prieto, member of the Spanish Socialist Workers' Party (PSOE);

Chief of Staff
Engineering Captain Juan Manzano Porqueres;

See also
Mixed Brigades

References

Bibliography

External links
 SBHAC - El Ejército Popular
 Organización militar republicana - 1936 - La Guerra Civil 

Military units and formations established in 1936
Military units and formations disestablished in 1939
Divisions of Spain
Military units and formations of the Spanish Civil War
Military history of Spain
Armed Forces of the Second Spanish Republic